Tegan Marie Higginbotham (born 25 March 1988) is an Australian comedian, writer and actress. Higginbotham contributes regularly as a sports columnist for The Age and writes a blog.

Personal life
Higginbotham was born in Dandenong, a suburb of Melbourne. She attended Dandenong Primary School and recently wowed audiences at the Class of 2018 Primary School Graduation. She has a penchant for sports and sci-fi, and describes herself as "a big nerd at heart, whose favourite things ever are Star Wars and Harry Potter." Higginbotham currently lives in Melbourne.
She married Paul Verhoeven in a civil ceremony in Paris in July 2019.

Career
Higginbotham's first love was acting, until she discovered comedy in her late teens, and performed her first comedy gig at the age of 17. Higginbotham has performed at every Melbourne International Comedy Festival since becoming a National Finalist at the festival's Class Clowns comedy competition in 2005. She began her comedy career performing wild fast-paced sketch shows with fellow comedians Rob Lloyd and Adam McKenzie as the trio 'The Hounds', which later morphed into 'Watson', without Lloyd. At the age of 21, Higginbotham began performing solo with her debut comedy show 'Million Dollar Tegan' nominated for the Best Newcomer Award at the Melbourne International Comedy Festival in 2012. In 2016, Higginbotham was a regular cast member for the Australian version of Whose Line Is It Anyway?.

Higginbotham co-hosted the controversial ABC2 pre-game, half-time and post-game coverages of the Liverpool F.C versus Sydney FC match with Julian Schiller and Steen Raskopoulos on 24 May 2017.

Higginbotham joined Nicole Livingstone and Amberley Lobo as co-host and regular panellist on the one-hour live entertainment and sports comedy panel show called Sideliners which premiered on ABC TV on 30 June 2017.

Live comedy shows

Solo comedy shows
2012: Million Dollar Tegan 
2013: Touched By Fev 
2014: Game Changer 
2016: The City of Love

Collaborative comedy shows
2006–2007: The Hound of the Baskervilles 
2007: Every Film Ever Made 
2008–2009: The Last Bucket of Water 
2010: Robot V's World 
2010: Jabba's Comedy Hutt 
2011: The Terminativity 
2011: Super Secret Awesome Show 
2012: Shakespeare Fight Club 
2014: The Wrestling 
2015: Who's Afraid of the Dark? 
2016: The Life Education Van for Adults!
2017: Go to Hell
2018: Watson World Tour

Filmography

Community and charity work
Higginbotham performed at the Heart of St Kilda concert in 2014 with comedians Julia Morris, Charlie Pickering, musical comedy trio Tripod, ventriloquist Dean Atkinson, Greg Champion of the Coodabeens and comedy character Elliot Goblet, to raise funds for Sacred Heart Mission which assists hundreds of people who are homeless or living in poverty to find shelter, food, care and support every day of the year.

Awards
Higginbotham has garnered a variety of award nominations for her diverse work as a comedian and writer, including Best Newcomer nominee for her debut solo show Million Dollar Tegan at the 2012 Melbourne International Comedy Festival, a Golden Gibbo Award nomination for Shakespeare Fight Club with Adam McKenzie as the duo 'Watson' in 2012, and an AWGIE (Australian Writers' Guild) award nomination shared with an ensemble of writers for the television show This is Littleton in the Best Comedy: Sketch or Light Entertainment category in 2014. In 2014, Higginbotham, McKenzie and guest co-star comedian Liam Ryan as the ensemble group 'Watson', won the Best Comedy Award at the Melbourne International Comedy Festival for their comedy show Who's Afraid of the Dark? . In 2015, 'Watson' returned for another season of Who's Afraid of the Dark? at the Melbourne International Comedy Festival and was nominated for a Golden Gibbo Award.

References

External links
Tegan Higginbotham's official blog

Tegan Higginbotham's entertainer biography at Creative Representation

Australian women comedians
Living people
Comedians from Melbourne
1988 births